Stephen Klaidman (born 1938) is an  American author.

Biography
Klaidman was also a former editor and reporter for The New York Times, The Washington Post, and the International Herald Tribune. He was a senior research fellow at the Kennedy Institute of Ethics and a senior research associate at the Institute for Health Policy Analysis, Georgetown University.  He currently lives in Bethesda, Maryland.

Books
Sydney and Violet: Their Life with T.S. Eliot, Proust, Joyce, and the Excruciatingly Irascible Wyndham Lewis (Nan A. Talese/Doubleday, 2013) The book was selected by Denis Donoghue as a Book of the Year in the Irish Times.

References

Living people
1938 births
American male journalists